The 2021–22 Howard Bison men's basketball team represented Howard University in the 2021–22 NCAA Division I men's basketball season. The Bison, led by third-year head coach Kenny Blakeney, played their home games at Burr Gymnasium in Washington, D.C. as members of the Mid-Eastern Athletic Conference.

Previous season
The Bison finished the 2020–21 season 1–4, 0–0 in MEAC play before suspending their season on February 9, 2021 due to an abundance of positive cases amongst their players amid the COVID-19 pandemic.

Roster

Schedule and results

|-
!colspan=12 style=| Exhibition

|-
!colspan=12 style=| Regular season

|-
!colspan=9 style=| MEAC tournament

Sources

References

Howard Bison men's basketball seasons
Howard Bison
Howard Bison men's basketball
Howard Bison men's basketball